Trioceros werneri,  Wemer's chameleon or Wemer's three-horned chameleon, is a species of chameleon endemic to Tanzania.

References

Trioceros
Reptiles described in 1899
Taxa named by Gustav Tornier
Reptiles of Tanzania